Crangon is a genus of shrimp.

Distribution
Crangon species are found exclusively in the Northern Hemisphere, with most of the species occurring in the northern Pacific Ocean. C. septemspinosa is the only species in the genus to occur in the north-western Atlantic Ocean, while in the north-eastern Atlantic, C. crangon and C. allmani occur. With the exception of the important commercial species C. crangon, however, the distributions of Crangon species are poorly characterised. The greater number of species in the Pacific Ocean is thought to indicate that the genus originated in the Pacific.

Species
Crangon contains the following extant species:

Crangon affinis De Haan, 1849
Crangon alaskensis Lockington, 1877
Crangon alba Holmes, 1900
Crangon allmani Kinahan, 1860
Crangon amurensis Bražnikov, 1907
Crangon capensis Stimpson, 1860
Crangon cassiope De Man, 1906
Crangon crangon (Linnaeus, 1758)
Crangon dalli Rathbun, 1902
Crangon franciscorum Stimpson, 1856
Crangon hakodatei Rathbun, 1902
Crangon handi Kuris & Carlton, 1977
Crangon holmesi Rathbun, 1902
Crangon lockingtonii Holmes, 1904
Crangon nigricauda Stimpson, 1856
Crangon nigromaculata Lockington, 1877
Crangon propinquus Stimpson, 1860
Crangon septemspinosa Say, 1818
Crangon uritai Hayashi & J. N. Kim, 1999

A further two species are known from the fossil record.

References

Decapod genera
Taxa named by Johan Christian Fabricius
Crangonidae